Yaroslav Semenovich Stetsko (19 January 1912 – 5 July 1986) was a Ukrainian politician, writer and Nazi collaborator, who served as the leader of Stepan Bandera's Organization of Ukrainian Nationalists (OUN), from 1968 until his death. During Operation Barbarossa, the Nazi German invasion of the Soviet Union in 1941, he was self-proclaimed temporary head of an independent Ukrainian government declared by Bandera. Stetsko was the head of the Anti-Bolshevik Bloc of Nations until 1986, the year of his death.

Early life
Stetsko was born on 19 January 1912 in Tarnopol, Austria-Hungary (now Ternopil, Ukraine) into a Ukrainian Catholic priest's family. His father, Semen, and his mother, Teodoziya, née Chubaty, encouraged him to pursue a higher education. Yaroslav not only graduated from high school in Ternopil, but later studied law and philosophy at the Kraków and Lwów Universities, graduating in 1934.

Yaroslav Stetsko was active in Ukrainian nationalist organizations from an early age. He was a member of three separate organizations: "Ukrayinska Natsionalistychna Molod'" (Ukrainian Nationalist Youth) where he became a member of the National Executive in 1932, Ukrainian Military Organization (UVO) and eventually the Organization of Ukrainian Nationalists (OUN).

Because of his anti-Polish activities and the recent assassination of Bronisław Pieracki by Ukrainian nationalists, Stetsko was arrested by Polish authorities in 1934 and sentenced to a 5-year term. This sentence was reduced, and Stetsko was released in 1937 in a general amnesty.

World War II

Nazis and the OUN
According to the National Academy of Sciences of Ukraine and other sources, OUN leaders had meetings with the heads of Nazi Germany's intelligence, regarding the formation of "Nachtigall" and "Roland" Battalions. In spring the OUN received 2.5 million marks for subversive activities inside the USSR.

Operation Barbarossa
On 30 June 1941, Stetsko declared in Lviv the formation of a Ukrainian National Government which "will closely cooperate with the National-Socialist Greater Germany, under the leadership of its leader Adolf Hitler which is forming a new order in Europe and the world" – as stated in the text of the "Act of Proclamation of Ukrainian Statehood"
Gestapo and Abwehr officials protected Bandera followers, as both organizations intended to use them for their own purposes.

On 3 July 1941 Stetsko wrote a letter to Adolf Hitler in which he expressed his gratitude and admiration for the German army, and wished the war with the USSR to end with a quick victory. This letter was not included in the list of documents of the National Academy of Sciences of Ukraine "OUN in 1941".

On 5 July, OUN-B leader Bandera was placed under honorary arrest in Kraków, and transported to Berlin the next day. On 14 July, he was released, but required to stay in Berlin. On 12 July 1941 he was joined in Berlin by his deputy Yaroslav Stetsko, whom the Germans had moved from Lviv after an unsuccessful attempt by unknown persons to assassinate him. During July–August both of them submitted dozens of proposals for cooperation to different Nazi institutions (OKW, RSHA etc.) and freely communicated with their followers. 

After the assassination of two key members of the Melnyk OUN, said to have been carried out by members of the OUN-B, Bandera and Stetsko were held in the central Berlin prison at Spandau from 15 September 1941 until January 1942, when they were transferred to Sachsenhausen concentration camp's special barrack for high-profile political prisoners, Zellenbau.

In April 1944 Stepan Bandera and his deputy Yaroslav Stetsko were approached by Otto Skorzeny to discuss plans for diversions and sabotage against the Soviet Army.

In September 1944 Stetsko and Stepan Bandera were released by the German authorities in the hope that he would rouse the native populace to fight the advancing Soviet Army. With German consent, Bandera set up headquarters in Berlin. The Germans supplied the OUN-B and the UIA by air with arms and equipment. Assigned German personnel and agents trained to conduct terrorist and intelligence activities behind Soviet lines, as well as some OUN-B leaders, were also transported by air until early 1945.

In April 1945 Stetsko was seriously injured during an Allied air-attack on a Nazi military convoy in Bohemia.

Antisemitism
In August 1941 Stetsko allegedly wrote his autobiography. It was addressed to the German authorities, and contained several notable antisemitic passages; in particular he stated that he considered Marxism a product of Jewish thought, that was put into practice by the Muscovite-Asiatic people with Jewish assistance, and that Moscow and the Jews are the carriers of the international ideas of the Bolsheviks. He stated that although he considered Moscow rather than the Jews to be the main enemy of imprisoned Ukraine, he absolutely endorsed the idea of the indubitably harmful role of Jews in the enslavement of Ukraine by Moscow. He finally stated that he absolutely endorsed the extermination of the Jews, and the rationality of the German methods of extermination of Jews, instead of assimilating them. Taras Hunczak has questioned the document's authenticity. Hunczak also notes that it was written before there were any mass atrocities against the Jews.

Regardless of this, in the second half of the 1950s, Yaroslav Stetsko collaborated with Haviv Shyber, who represented the Israeli organization Anti-Communist Voice of Jerusalem, to form a world anti-communist organization.

After the war
Stetsko continued to be very active politically after World War II. In 1968 he became the head of the OUN-B. He also became a board member of the World Anti-Communist League.

Anti-Bolshevik Bloc of Nations
In 1946, Stetsko spearheaded the creation of a new anti-Soviet organization, the Anti-Bolshevik Bloc of Nations (ABN). He was president of this organization until his death.

In 1983 he was received at the United States Capitol and, later, at the White House, where President Ronald Reagan and Vice President George H. W. Bush received him as the "last premier of a free Ukrainian State".

Death

On 5 July 1986, Yaroslav Stetsko died in Munich, Germany. He was 74 years old. Stetsko was buried in the Munich Waldfriedhof.

Legacy
Stetsko's book "Two Revolutions" (1951) is the ideological cornerstone of the ultranationalist party All-Ukrainian Union "Svoboda". The essence of this doctrine is: "the revolution will not end with the establishment of the Ukrainian state, but will go on to establish equal opportunities for all people to create and share material and spiritual values and in this respect the national revolution is also a social one".

In 2010, at the initiative of Viktor Yushchenko, a plaque for Yaroslav Stetsko was mounted at his home in Zeppelinstraße 67 in Munich.

References

1912 births
1986 deaths
Members of the Ukrainian Greek Catholic Church
Organization of Ukrainian Nationalists politicians
Politicians from Ternopil
People from the Kingdom of Galicia and Lodomeria
Ukrainian Austro-Hungarians
Sachsenhausen concentration camp survivors
Ukrainian collaborators with Nazi Germany
Ukrainian people of World War II
Ukrainian politicians before 1991
Ukrainian independence activists
Ukrainian anti-communists
Genocide perpetrators